Gaerwen railway station was situated on the North Wales Coast Line, serving as the junction for the Anglesey Central Railway line to Amlwch.

History
The Station was built by the Chester and Holyhead Railway (C&HR) and opened in January 1849. The C&HR was acquired by the London and North Western Railway (LNWR) on 1 January 1859 and the LNWR was merged into the London Midland and Scottish Railway on 1 January 1923.

The main station building was located on the north side of the line, serving eastbound trains. There was a small shelter on the Holyhead bound platform.

The station was closed to passengers by British Railways on 14 February 1966, but the adjoining freight yard remained open for coal and fertiliser traffic before it also closed in 1984.

There were two signal boxes close to the station, one of which remains in use. It is located on the north side of the line at the east end of the old station site and adjacent to a level crossing which is now guarded by lifting barriers. 
The junction to the Anglesey Central Railway has been disconnected after services were discontinued on the branch line.

The bid was successful during the third round of that scheme, and received £50,000 to fund the study. When the bid was submitted, the Welsh government stated that they would match fund any award that was received, raising the value of the award to £100,000.

References

Further reading

Disused railway stations in Anglesey
Beeching closures in Wales
Railway stations in Great Britain opened in 1849
Railway stations in Great Britain closed in 1966
Former London and North Western Railway stations
Llanfihangel Ysgeifiog
1849 establishments in Wales
1966 disestablishments in Wales